Kontar is a surname. Notable people with the surname include:
 
 Hassan Al Kontar, Syrian refugee who was stranded at Kuala Lumpur International Airport
 Zoltán Kontár, Slovak professional footballer
 Samir Kontar, Lebanese politician

See also 
 Kuntar
 Kantar (disambiguation)